Křešice is a municipality and village in Litoměřice District in the Ústí nad Labem Region of the Czech Republic. It has about 1,400 inhabitants.

Administrative parts
Villages of Nučnice, Sedlec, Třeboutice and Zahořany are administrative parts of Křešice.

References

Villages in Litoměřice District